USS LST-359 was a  in the United States Navy during World War II.

Construction and career 
LST-359 was laid down on 21 November 1942 at Charleston Navy Yard, Charleston, South Carolina. Launched on 11 January 1943 and commissioned on 9 February 1943.

During World War II, LST-388 was assigned to the Europe-Africa-Middle theater. She took part in the Sicilian occupation in Italy from 9 to 15 July 1943 and 28 July to 17 August 1943. Then the Salerno landings from 9 to 21 September of the same year.

She then participated in the Anzio-Nettuno landings, 22 January to 1 March and in the Invasion of Normandy from 6 to 25 June 1944.

She was sunk by U-870 while under tow by a Type V tugboat, named Farallon and split into two off Spain with 2 casualties on 20 December 1944.

LST-359 was struck from the Navy Register on 8 February 1945.

Awards 
LST-359 have earned the following awards:

American Campaign Medal
Combat Action Ribbon
European-Africa-Middle East Campaign Medal (5 battle stars)
Navy Unit Commendation 
World War II Victory Medal

Citations 

World War II amphibious warfare vessels of the United States
Ships built in Charleston, South Carolina
1943 ships
LST-1-class tank landing ships of the United States Navy
Ships sunk by German submarines in World War II